Ibrahim Tondi (born 10 March 1985) is a Nigerien hurdler.

Tondi competed for Niger at the 2004 Summer Olympics in the Men's 400 metre hurdles, but was knocked out in the heats.

His personal best time is 52.43 seconds, achieved in July 2004 in Brazzaville.

External links

1985 births
Living people
Nigerien male hurdlers
Athletes (track and field) at the 2004 Summer Olympics
Olympic athletes of Niger
21st-century Nigerien people